Aechmea perforata is a bromeliad native to Brazil, States of Bahia and Espírito Santo.  This plant is often used as an ornamental plant.

References

External links
Aechmea perforata photos

perforata
Flora of Brazil
Plants described in 1941